The  is the 14th edition of the Japan Film Professional Awards. It awarded the best of 2004 in film. The ceremony did not take place in this year.

Awards 
Best Film: Kamikaze Girls
Best Director: Hiroshi Takahashi (Sodom no Ichi)
Best Director: Tetsuya Nakashima (Kamikaze Girls)
Best Actress: Yū Aoi (Hana and Alice)
Best Actor: Ryo Kase (Antenna)
Best New Director: Izuru Narushima (Yudan Taiteki)

10 best films
 Kamikaze Girls (Tetsuya Nakashima)
 Riarizumu no Yado (Nobuhiro Yamashita)
 Swing Girls (Shinobu Yaguchi)
 Sodom no Ichi (Hiroshi Takahashi)
 Yudan Taiteki (Izuru Narushima)
 Nobody Knows (Hirokazu Koreeda)
 Inuneko (Nami Iguchi)
 Koi Suru Yōchū (Noboru Iguchi)
 Takada Wataru Teki (Yuki Tanada)
 Tōkyō Genpatsu'' (Gen Yamakawa)

References

External links
  

Japan Film Professional Awards
2005 in Japanese cinema
Japan Film Professional Awards